A Royal Air Force University Air Squadron recruiting within Scotland, Universities of Glasgow and Strathclyde Air Squadron (commonly known as UGSAS) draws its members from six higher education establishments within Glasgow and its surrounding areas.

Its headquarters are in the West End of Glasgow in the Park District and is equipped with three Grob Tutor aircraft which are based at the flying element of the squadron at Glasgow Airport.

The Squadron has approximately 65 student members—the majority of whom hold the rank of Officer Cadet as members of the RAF Volunteer Reserve, and is split into three flights—Clydesdale, Houston and MacIntyre. The Squadron also hosts all DTUS students attending Strathclyde University, who form Everest Flight

The Squadron is a remote unit of 6 FTS.

History

Formation and World War Two
The Squadron was formed as Glasgow University Air Squadron on 13 January 1941, initially recruiting only from the University of Glasgow and during the war years was actively engaged in the pre-entry training of students for the Royal Air Force. By the end of hostilities, some 400 members had entered the service in various aircrew categories though the Squadron did not operate aircraft during this period.

Post war changes
The squadron operated there on and off until 1993. At the same time the Squadron was re-equipped with the De Havilland Chipmunk. In 1965 when the Royal College of Science and Technology became Strathclyde University the squadron was renamed to its current name to reflect this change. In 1969 the Squadron moved back to the now Glasgow Airport. The Scottish Aviation Bulldog replaced the Chipmunk in 1974.

The modern squadron
More recently students from the University of Strathclyde, University of Stirling, Glasgow School of Art, Glasgow Caledonian University and The University of the West of Scotland have been eligible for Squadron membership and as of 1996 the Squadron became parent to No.4 Air Experience Flight and in March 2000 the squadron was equipped with its current aircraft, the Grob Tutor. In January 2008 the Squadron was re-organised into two flights – Clydesdale and MacIntyre – named in honour after Lord Clydesdale and David MacIntyre, both were prominent aviators in the 1930s in 602 (City Of Glasgow) Sqn RAuxAF. The Squadron detaches up to three times a year for a period of three to four weeks at a time, formerly to either RAF Kinloss or RAF Leuchars, but since those bases have closed, more normally they deploy to RAF Lossiemouth. Whilst deployed, the squadron undertakes a period of intensive flying and adventure training.

Aircraft operated

De Havilland Tiger Moth T.2 (1946-1950)
Miles Magister (1946-1950)
De Havilland Chipmunk T.10 (1950-1974)
Scottish Aviation Bulldog T.1 (1974-2000)
Grob 115E Tutor T.1 (2000-2010)
Grob 115EA Tutor T.2 (2010 – present)

Incidents
 11 December 2002 - a Grob Tutor crashed into a field in Gartocharn, near Loch Lomond, after engine failure. Both the student pilot and instructor managed to walk away from the crash unharmed.

See also
Birmingham University Air Squadron
East of Scotland Universities Air Squadron
Liverpool University Air Squadron
Oxford University Air Squadron
University Royal Naval Unit, the Royal Navy equivalent
Officers Training Corps, the British Army equivalent
List of Royal Air Force aircraft squadrons

References

External links

Squadron website

Aviation in Scotland
Clubs and societies of the University of Glasgow
Glasgow
University of Strathclyde